253 Squadron of the Israeli Air Force, also known as the Negev Squadron, is an F-16I fighter squadron based at Ramon Airbase.

On 21 March 2018 Israel's government officially confirmed 253 Squadron, along with 69 and 119 Squadrons, took part and successfully completed Operation Orchard on 6 September 2007 destroying the nuclear installations of Syria constructed with the help of North Korea.

References

External links 

Israeli Air Force squadrons